Ratnechaur  is a market center in Beni Municipality in Myagdi District in the Dhaulagiri Zone of western-central Nepal. The former village development committee was annexed to form the new municipality on May 18, 2014.  At the time of the 1991 Nepal census it had a population of 2369 people living in 434 individual households.

References

External links
UN map of the municipalities of Myagdi District

Populated places in Myagdi District